Goatskin refers to the skin of a goat, which by long term usage, is denoted by the term Morocco leather. Kidskin, used for gloves, shoes and other accessories, is traditionally goatskin, although other leathers such as sheep and kangaroo can be used to make kid.

Tanned leather from goatskin is considered extremely durable and is commonly used to make rugs (for example in Indonesia) and carpet binding. It is often used for gloves, boots, and other products that require a soft hide. Kid gloves, popular in Victorian times, are still made today. It has been a major material for leather bookbindings for centuries, and the oldest European binding, that of the St Cuthbert Gospel in the British Library is in red goatskin. Goatskin is used for a traditional Spanish container for wine bota bag (or called goatskin). Traditional kefir was made in bags from goatskin.

Non-tanned goatskin is used for parchment or for drumheads or sounding boards of some musical instruments, e.g., mišnice in medieval Europe, bodhrán in Ireland, esraj in India and for instrumental drum skin named bedug in Indonesia.

In Roman mythology priests of god Lupercalia wore goatskins.

A breed of goat that provides high-quality skin is for example the Black Bengal breed, native to Bangladesh.

In 1974, there was controversy in the United States surrounding goatskin products originating in Haiti. The U.S. Centers for Disease Control discovered that some of these products contained deadly anthrax spores. All Haitian goatskin products in the USA were recalled, although no fatalities were reported.

Gallery

See also
Goatskin-producing goat breeds
Mashk

References

Hides (skin)
Goats